Jhenaigati is an upazila of Sherpur District under the division of Mymensingh, Bangladesh.

Geography
It has 30,113 households and a total area of 231 km2. The upazila is bounded by the Meghalaya State of India on the north, Sherpur sadar and Sreebardi upazila on the south, Nalirabari upazila on the east, and Sreebardi upazila on the west. The main rivers are Shomeshwari, Maharashi and Subarnakhali.

Demographics

As of 2001 Bangladesh census, Jhenaigati upazila had a population of 1,60,554; males constituted 78791 of the population, females 76276; Muslim 146153, Hindu 5435, Buddhist 3388 and others 91.

Administration
Jhenaigati Thana was formed in 1975 and it was turned into an upazila in 1983.

Jhenaigati Upazila has a Upazila Concil and seven union councils: Kangsha, Dhanshail, Nalkura, Gouripur, Jhenaigati Sadar, Hatibandha and Malijhikanda. The union councils are subdivided into 75 mauzas and 117 villages.

U.N.O office, police station, banks, and many NGOs are here. Operationally important NGOs are BRAC, Asa, Grameen Bank, World Vision, SDS, Rangtia Satata Samchay, Rindan Samity and Didar Sangha.

See also 
Upazilas of Bangladesh
Districts of Bangladesh
Divisions of Bangladesh

References

Upazilas of Sherpur District